Noiodunum may refer to:

Nyon, Vaud, Switzerland
Jublains, Mayenne, France